Abdulrahman al-Ansary (10 October 1935 – 6 March 2023) was a Saudi Arabian archaeologist and professor of archeology at King Saud University, and also member of the first and second terms of the Consultative Assembly of Saudi Arabia. He is considered the founder of the rediscovery of archeological site of Qaryat al-Fau.

Education 
Al-Ansary earned a bachelor's degree in Arabic language and literature from Cairo University in 1960 and a Doctor of Philosophy degree from the department of Semitic Studies of the University of Leeds in 1966.  During his doctoral studies, he focused on the comparative study of Lihynite personal names and trained at archeological excavations with his thesis supervisor at Durham University and Motya, Sicily, and with Professor Kathleen Kenyon in Jerusalem in 1966.

Career 
Al-Ansary was a faculty member of King Saud University (formerly Riyadh University) from 1966 to 1999 where he held several positions and roles including dean of the College of Arts (1971–1972 and 1988–1994), chairman of the Department of History (1974–1978) and chairman of the Department of Archeology and Museology (1978–1986). Between 1996 and 2001, he served as a member of the Consultative Assembly of Saudi Arabia, which were its first two terms.

Al-Ansary is considered the pioneering academic who established the study of archeology in Saudi Arabia by taking the leading role in creating an archeology concentration in the Department of History at King Saud University and later the Department of Archeology and Museology in 1978, the first in the country.  Professor al-Ansary is perhaps most known for leading the archeological excavation in the city of Qaryat al-Fau between 1972 and 1995 while at King Saud University.  In 1982 he authored a book entitled "Qaryat al-Fau: A Portrait of Pre-Islamic Civilisation in Saudi Arabia", which presented the results of the first six seasons of excavation.

Books

Death 
Al-Ansary died on 6 March 2023, at the age of 87.

References 

1935 births
2023 deaths
Archaeologists of the Near East
Cairo University alumni
Alumni of the University of Leeds
Academic staff of King Saud University
Saudi Arabian archaeologists
People from Medina
20th-century archaeologists
Members of the Consultative Assembly of Saudi Arabia
20th-century Saudi Arabian politicians